Vectisuchus is a genus of goniopholidid mesoeucrocodylian, known from the Early Cretaceous-age Wealden Group of the Isle of Wight, England.  It was a small, piscivorous crocodylomorph with a narrow, elongate snout, and relatively long forearms.  The type specimen, SMNS 50984, was found in 1977.  When discovered, it was complete and right-side-up, but the posterior portion was lost during excavation.  Vectisuchus was described in 1980.  The type species is V. leptognathus.

References

External links
Vectisuchus in the Paleobiology Database
Vectisuchus at DinoWight

Early Cretaceous reptiles of Europe
Early Cretaceous crocodylomorphs of Europe
Neosuchians
Prehistoric pseudosuchian genera